Rio de Janeiro (ship) may refer to:

 , two battleships
 , the original name of the escort carrier HMS Dasher
 
 , container ship built in 2008
 
 
 
 
 Rio de Janeiro Maru ( or ), Imperial Japanese Navy submarine tender

Ship names